Baiganwadi (Shivaji Nagar No:2) is located in Govandi (West), a suburb of Mumbai, India. Baiganwadi has Mumbai's oldest and largest waste dumping ground, divided in plots by crossing roads and gullies.

Geography
Baiganwadi is located between Shivaji Nagr No :1 and Mankhurd. Mumbai's largest waste dumping ground is to its north, and to the east is the Thane Creek.

Populace and Cultural 
Baiganwadi is very densely populated. Many people may share the same room (10 Ft. X 15 Ft). Most of the population are immigrants from Bihar and Uttar Pradesh.

Economy

Baiganwadi is one of the worst-hit areas by water shortage in Mumbai. There is no proper water supply in the area. There are plenty of illegal water connections.

References 

Slums of Mumbai
Suburbs of Mumbai